The 2021 Hankook 12 Hours of Circuit Paul Ricard was the inaugural running of the 12 Hours of Circuit Paul Ricard which took place on 24 April 2021. It was also the third round of the 2021 24H GT and TCE Series and the fourth 24H Series event at the circuit, having held three 24-hour races from 2015 to 2017.

Schedule

Entry list
25 cars were entered into the event; 17 GT cars and 8 TCEs. A new addition was SPS automotive performance with a Mercedes-AMG GT3 Evo. After switching to TCX in the previous round at Mugello, Speed Lover entered two Porsches, the newest Porsche Cup car, the Porsche 992 GT3 Cup in GTX and a Porsche 991 GT3 Cup II in the 991 class. Another new car for the 2021 season was the Ligier JS2 R of French team Nordschleife Racing, competing in the TCX class.

Qualifying

TCE
Series-regulars Autorama Motorsport by Wolf-Power Racing and AC Motorsport fought throughout the session for TCE pole position. The #112 car came out on top with Yannick Mettler setting the fastest time (2:15.801) with five and a half minutes to go, only six tenths ahead of the #188 Audi (2:15.868) followed by the sister Autorama car in third (2:16.079). Two Cupras run by Spanish teams Tictap Totcar Sport and RC2 Junior Team by Cabra Racing placed fourth (2:16.133) and fifth (2:16.212) respectively, with the TCR class being rounded out by the Red Camel-Jordans.nl Cupra (2:16.414). The winless CWS Engineering team scored pole position for a second time (2:16.646) almost half a second clear of the second-placed Nordschleife Racing Ligier (2:17.065).

Results
Fastest in class in bold.

GT
All but one car took part in the qualifying session for GT cars. By the halfway point, the #11 MiddleCap racing with Scuderia Praha Ferrari had set multiple fast times in the 2:02s, with Herberth Motorsport challenging for the pole with both cars battling with the Ferrari. With eight minutes to go, the #701 Vortex V8 pulled off the track on the Mistral Straight, Olivier Gomez parking the car in a safe place, allowing the session to continue. Five minutes to go, Josef Král set the fastest lap time of the session (2:02.303), putting the car on pole position, ahead of the #91 (2:02.435) and #92 (2:02.451) Porsches, despite spinning on the next lap. Reiter Engineering's KTM X-Bow GTX Concept claimed the GTX pole (2:06.774) ahead of the #701 Vortex (2:07.187) and the #979 Porsche (2:08.280). Home team Porsche Lorient Racing (2:09.349) claimed the 991 class pole position, over a second clear of both DUWO Racing (2:10.763) and Speed Lover (2:13.595). The only GT4 car that participated in the session was the #438 ST Racing BMW M4 GT4 (2:15.875), the Aston Martin Vantage AMR GT4 of PROsport Performance AMR unable to even leave the garage; a crash in free practice spoiling their chances to qualify but having a spare car on hand meant they could contest the race on Saturday.

Results
Fastest in class in bold.

Race

Results
Class winner in bold.

Footnotes

References

External links

12 Hours of Circuit Paul Ricard
12 Hours of Circuit Paul Ricard
2021 in 24H Series